Paraclivina is a genus of ground beetles in the family Carabidae. There are about 10 described species in Paraclivina.

Species
 Listronotus distinctus Henderson LS, 1941
 Paraclivina bipustulata (Fabricius, 1798)
 Paraclivina convexa (LeConte, 1844)
 Paraclivina fasciata (Putzeys, 1846)
 Paraclivina ferrea (LeConte, 1857)
 Paraclivina marginipennis (Putzeys, 1846)
 Paraclivina postica (LeConte, 1846)
 Paraclivina stigmula (Putzeys, 1846)
 Paraclivina striatopunctata (Dejean, 1831)
 Paraclivina sulcipennis (Putzeys, 1867)

References

Further reading

 
 
 
 
 
 
 
 
 
 

Scaritinae